A family business is a company owned and operated by members of one or more families.

Family Business may also refer to:

Music
 Family Business (2-4 Family album), 1999
 Family Business (E.S.G. album), 2005
 Family Business (Ronnie Penque album), 2019
 A Family Business, a compilation soundtrack album from the TV series Brandy & Ray J: A Family Business, 2011
 "Family Business", a song by Fish from Vigil in a Wilderness of Mirrors, 1990
 "Family Business", a song by the Fugees from The Score, 1996
 "Family Business", a song by Kanye West from The College Dropout, 2004

Television

Series
 Family Business (American TV series), a 2003–2006 American reality series
 Family Business (British TV series), a 2004 British drama series
 Family Business (French TV series), a 2019 French streaming series
 The Family Business (Australian TV series), a 1989 Australian sitcom
 The Family Business (American TV series), an American crime family drama series that premiered in 2018

Episodes
 "Family Business" (American Dragon: Jake Long)
 "Family Business" (Burn Notice)
 "Family Business" (Courage the Cowardly Dog)
 The Family Business" (Dexter: New Blood)
 "Family Business" (Law & Order)
 "Family Business" (Once Upon a Time)
 "Family Business" (Star Trek: Deep Space Nine)
 "Family Business" (Yu-Gi-Oh! GX)

Other media
 Family Business (1986 film), a French comedy film directed by Costa-Gavras
 Family Business (1989 film), an American crime film directed by Sidney Lumet
 Family Business (game), a dedicated deck card game
 Family Business Review, an academic journal
 Family Business (novel), a 1985 novel by Vincent Patrick, basis for the 1989 film
 Family Business, a 2008 chapbook by Judith Arcana

See also
 Crime family
 Organized crime